Kayenta Airport  is a public use airport located  southeast of the central business district of Kayenta, in Navajo County, Arizona, United States. It is owned by Kayenta Township, which is part of the Navajo Nation.

This airport is included in the National Plan of Integrated Airport Systems, which categorized it as a general aviation facility. It is one of six airports owned by the Navajo Nation; the other five being Chinle Airport (E91), Tuba City Airport (T03) and Window Rock Airport (RQE) in Arizona, plus Crownpoint Airport (0E8) and Shiprock Airport (5V5) in New Mexico.

Facilities and aircraft 
It has one runway designated 5/23 with an asphalt surface measuring 7,101 by 75 feet (2,164 x 23 m). For the 12-month period ending April 17, 2010, the airport had 2,000 aircraft operations, an average of 166 per month: 75% general aviation and 25% air taxi.

References

External links 
 Kayenta Airport (0V7) at Arizona DOT
 Kayenta Airport at Navajo Air Transportation Department
 Aerial image as of June 1997 from USGS The National Map
 

Airports in Navajo County, Arizona
Navajo Nation airports